Rona E. Kramer is an American politician from Maryland, a member of the Democratic Party, and a former member of the Maryland State Senate. She finished serving her 2nd term in the Maryland State Senate, representing Maryland's District 14 in Montgomery County in 2010. She was defeated in the 2010 primary election by Karen S. Montgomery by 116 votes.

Background
Born in Washington, DC on August 16, 1954, Kramer grew up in a Montgomery County family prominent in the business and political communities. Her father, Sidney Kramer, served as a State Senator and as the County Executive of Montgomery County. Rona Kramer received a bachelor's degree from the University of Maryland, College Park and a Juris Doctor degree from the University of Baltimore School of Law. After joining the Maryland Bar, she went to work for her family's business, Kramer Enterprises, a shopping center management company, eventually becoming President and General Counsel.

In the legislature
Kramer was elected to an open seat in the State Senate in 2002 when redistricting placed District 14 entirely in Montgomery County for the first time. Kramer served on the Budget and Taxation Committee in the Maryland Senate. She was a member of both the Judicial Proceedings Committee and the Executive Nominations Committee. She was joined in the General Assembly by her brother Benjamin F. Kramer in 2006, when he was elected to the House of Delegates. In the 2010 Democratic Primary, Kramer was defeated after being challenged by Delegate Karen S. Montgomery.

References

Democratic Party Maryland state senators
Living people
1954 births
University of Maryland, College Park alumni
University of Baltimore alumni
Women state legislators in Maryland
People from Olney, Maryland
21st-century American politicians
21st-century American women politicians